Stambaugh is a surname. Notable people with the surname include:

 Isabel Stambaugh, United States Army nurse during World War I 
 Melanie Stambaugh, American politician
 Wesley Stambaugh, Canadian Senator
 Robert F. Stambaugh, American economist
 John E. Stambaugh, American classical scholar
 Joan Stambaugh, American philosopher